Steven Marc Zeitels (born November 7, 1957) is the Eugene B. Casey Professor of Laryngeal Surgery at Harvard Medical School and the Director of Massachusetts General Hospital (MGH) Center for Laryngeal Surgery and Voice Rehabilitation (MGH Voice Center]).   He specializes in diseases and disorders of the throat, voice, airway, and larynx. His contributions to voice and laryngeal surgery are highly recognized in the USA and throughout the world. In 2004, the first endowed Chair in Laryngeal Surgery at Harvard Medical School was created for him while he re-established a Harvard Laryngeal Surgery service at the MGH, which had not been present since the 1920s. He has received more than 75 awards and honored lectureships for his achievements including the Casselberry Award, DeRoaldes Medal and the Newcomb Award from the American Laryngological Association (founded in 1879). Zeitels was the 4th surgeon in the organization's history to win all three awards. He has also received the Chevalier Jackson Award and the annual Broyles Maloney Award (3 times) from the American Broncho-Esophageal Association (founded in 1917), as well as the Distinguished Alumnus Award from the Boston University (BU) School of Medicine in 2007. Zeitels is also well known for performing complex microsurgery to restore the voices of performing vocalists and has done so on 18 Grammy award-winning artists.

Career

Zeitels grew up in New Rochelle, New York. His father and mother, an orthodontist and elementary school teacher, pressed him to take up a career in medicine. At the age of 17, Zeitels was selected to be in the 1st class of Boston University Trustee Scholars, an experimental educational program for gifted teens as well as the Boston University's accelerated six-year medical program. He graduated from the BU School of Medicine in 1982. Knowing he wanted to be a surgeon he completed the BU - Tufts combined Otolaryngology – Head and Neck Surgery Program in 1987 as well as a Head & Neck Surgical Oncology Fellowship at BU and the Boston Veterans Affairs Medical Center in 1988.

Zeitels is regarded as a prolific surgical innovator having designed numerous new voice restoration procedures (phonosurgery) and surgical instruments, and holds six patents for these innovations.  He is widely acknowledged for pioneering novel laser applications to treat dysplasia and cancer as well as laryngeal papillomatosis, polyps, nodules and is also well known for perfecting office-based laryngeal laser surgery. Most notable, was his introduction of angiolytic laser treatment of vocal cord cancer, which was a groundbreaking achievement evolving from Judah Folkman’s concepts of tumor angiogenesis and Rox Anderson’s theory of selective photothermolysis. He received the 2014 Broyles Maloney Award of the American Broncho-Esophagological Association for this revolutionary surgical research. Zeitels has also designed unique procedures to restore the voice of those who have had vocal paresis and paralysis. His techniques were featured in a National Geographic Channel documentary, “The Incredible Human Machine”, which highlighted Zeitels’ microsurgery on Steven Tyler of Aerosmith. Zeitels also performed a unique endoscopic removal of a tongue-base larynx cancer on Tom Hamilton, Aerosmith’s bass guitarist after radiation and chemotherapy failed to control his advanced throat cancer.

Zeitels has done performed surgery on many performing vocalists. Julie Andrews serves as the Honorary Chairwoman of the VHI Advisory Board. She, as well as Steven Tyler, Roger Daltrey, Christina Perri, Denyce Graves, Lionel Richie and Joe Buck, has collaborated with Zeitels to advance the cause of restoring lost voices. In Roger Daltrey's case, Zeitels removed precancerous dysplasia from his vocal fold just one month prior to his 2010 Super Bowl performance. In 2012, there was broad international coverage of Zeitels' microsurgery to restore Adele's voice; she thanked him in the acceptance of the first of her six Grammy Awards.

Larry Page, the founder of Google, described his difficulties with vocal nerve injury and has been a supporter of Zeitels and the Voice Health Institute. Zeitels conceived and directs the Voice Restoration Research Program, which is a collaborative effort of investigators at Harvard and MGH, as well as Robert Langer at MIT. They have spent over a decade developing a biomaterial that would restore the largest majority of human voice loss and the research group received the 2010 Broyles Maloney Award of the American Broncho-Esophagological Association for their effort.  They hope to initiate human trials to test the new vocal biogel in 2018.

Personal life

While in Chile lecturing as a guest of the Chilean Society of Otolaryngology in 2001 he met Maria Nuria Hananias, a Chilean otolaryngological surgeon. Married in 2003, they have two children, a boy and a girl.

Recognition

2012 Fast Company’s 100 Most Creative People (14th)
2012 Rolling Stone’s 25 Best Things in Rock (13th)

References

External links
 Massachusetts General Hospital's Voice Center
 Voice Health Institute - VHI (Non-Profit), formerly the Institute of Laryngology and Voice Restoration - ILVR

1957 births
Boston University School of Medicine alumni
Harvard Medical School faculty
American surgeons
Living people
People from New Rochelle, New York